Smart Tower (previously PLDT Tower) is a 36-storey skyscraper in 6799 Ayala Avenue, Makati.

The building was originally an unfinished 10-storey structure which was bought and developed by the Philippine Long Distance Telephone Company for their corporate headquarters. Completed in 2009, the new 34-storey tower was known as the PLDT Tower, and is designed by Pimentel Rodriguez Simbulan & Partners. It was eventually renamed to "Smart Tower" following the transfer of Smart Communications, one of their subsidiaries, to the site, becoming their headquarters.

In 2020, PLDT sold the building to DMC Urban Property Developers Inc. of the Consunji family for $128 million.

References

See also

Skyscrapers in Makati
Skyscraper office buildings in Metro Manila